Parbhubhai Nagarbhai Vasava ( Prabhu) (born 1 March 1970) is an Indian politician and a member of Lok Sabha from Bardoli (Lok Sabha constituency), Gujarat. He was a Congress MLA from Mandvi in 2012, but joined the Bharatiya Janata Party (BJP) in 2014. He won from Bardoli in 2014 and 2019 as a BJP candidate.

References

India MPs 2014–2019
Lok Sabha members from Gujarat
Bharatiya Janata Party politicians from Gujarat
Living people
People from Bardoli
1970 births
India MPs 2019–present